Langford Lloyd (28 December 1873 – 20 April 1956) was a British sports shooter. He competed in the 300m military rifle event at the 1912 Summer Olympics.

References

1873 births
1956 deaths
British male sport shooters
Olympic shooters of Great Britain
Shooters at the 1912 Summer Olympics
People from Belgravia
Sportspeople from London